Picasso Animation College is an animation college in India headquartered in Delhi, India. It runs in collaboration with Centennial College, Canada.

About
Picasso Animation College, headquartered in New Delhi, provides education in digital animation in conjunction with Toronto's Centennial College. Picasso Animation College held its first convocation at its Hyderabad campus in 2010, hosted by its director general, O. P. Sharma. There used to be a full-credit, 10-month program of Digital Animation (with an optional Art Design Fundamentals electoral the year before) with Centennial providing industry-trained instructors, including Philip Edward Alexy. However, as of 1 December 2011, Centennial now only offers a minor non-credit Adult Educational certification in Picasso's STAR program.

See also
 Indian animation industry
 Film and Television Institute of India
 State Institute of Film and Television
 Government Film and Television Institute
 Satyajit Ray Film and Television Institute

References

External links
 Official site
 Picasso Animation College Integrated BSc in Animation

Educational institutions established in 2001
Universities and colleges in Jaipur
Animation schools in India
2001 establishments in Delhi